The Renault 8G was a family of French liquid-cooled V-8 aero engines of the World War I era that produced from   to .

Design and development
Construction used separate cast iron blocks for each pair of cylinders, mounted on a light-alloy crankcase with an included vee angle of 50 degrees. Each bank had a single overhead camshaft, shaft-driven through bevel gears. It was equipped with a single dual-choke updraught Zenith carburettor, and twin spark ignition through four magnetos. The crankshaft was a flat plane with three bearings and four throws, each pair of cylinders sharing a master-slave connecting rod onto the same crankpin.

Variants
8G 
8Ga 
8Gb 
8Gc 
8Gd 
8Gdy 
8Ge

Applications 
 Dorand AR.1 - Renault 8Gd - 1917
 Farman F.80 - Renault 8Gd
 Dorand AR.2 - Renault 8Gdy

Specifications (8Gd)

See also

References

External links

 Renault Moteur d'aviation 150 chevaux - Notice descriptive sur le Fonctionnement et l'Entretien. Renault. (Renault 8Ga 150hp)

1910s aircraft piston engines
8G